Pergamasus is a genus of mites in the family Parasitidae.

Species
 Pergamasus alpestris (Berlese, 1903)     
 Pergamasus alpinus (Berlese, 1903)     
 Pergamasus atushiensis (Ma & Ye, 1999)     
 Pergamasus barbarus (Berlese, 1905)     
 Pergamasus belunensis Lombardini, 1962     
 Pergamasus brevipes (Berlese, 1906)     
 Pergamasus canestrinii (Berlese, 1884)     
 Pergamasus clavornatus Athias-Henriot, 1967     
 Pergamasus conspicillatus (Athias-Henriot, 1979)     
 Pergamasus crassipes (Linnaeus, 1758)     
 Pergamasus decipiens (Berlese, 1903)     
 Pergamasus dentipes (C.L. Koch, 1839)     
 Pergamasus digitulus (Karg, 1963)     
 Pergamasus falculiger (Berlese, 1906)     
 Pergamasus feistritzensis Schmolzer, 1995     
 Pergamasus franzi Willmann, 1951     
 Pergamasus giganteus Willmann, 1932     
 Pergamasus hamatus (C.L. Koch, 1839)     
 Pergamasus italicus Oudemans, 1905     
 Pergamasus jurani (Schmolzer, 1996)     
 Pergamasus koschutae (Schmolzer, 1995)     
 Pergamasus kotschnae Schmolzer, 1995     
 Pergamasus loculatus Tseng, 1995     
 Pergamasus longicornis (Berlese, 1906)     
 Pergamasus millisetosus Tseng, 1995     
 Pergamasus minor (Berlese, 1892)     
 Pergamasus mirifactus (Athias-Henriot, 1967)     
 Pergamasus misellus (Berlese, 1903)     
 Pergamasus norvegicus (Berlese, 1906)     
 Pergamasus noster (Berlese, 1903)     
 Pergamasus oxygynellus (Berlese, 1903)     
 Pergamasus paenisellus (Karg, 1998)     
 Pergamasus palatricus Athias-Henriot     
 Pergamasus pampinatus Tseng, 1995     
 Pergamasus patruelis (Athias-Henriot, 1979)     
 Pergamasus physomastax (Athias Henriot, 1980)     
 Pergamasus policentrus (Berlese, 1910)     
 Pergamasus potschulensis Schnolzer, 1991     
 Pergamasus prosapiaster (Athias-Henriot, 1979)     
 Pergamasus pseudoalpestris (Schmolzer, 1995)     
 Pergamasus quisquiliarum (Canestrini & Canestrini, 1882)     
 Pergamasus rhopalogynus (Berlese, 1910)     
 Pergamasus runcatellus (Berlese, 1903)     
 Pergamasus runciger (Berlese, 1903)     
 Pergamasus sagitta (Berlese, 1903)     
 Pergamasus sanctusspirituensis Schmolzer, 1995     
 Pergamasus shennongjiaensis (Ma & Liu, 1998)     
 Pergamasus telluricus (Hennessey & Farrier, 1989)     
 Pergamasus theseus (Berlese, 1903)     
 Pergamasus tiberinus (G. Canestrini & R. Canestrini, 1882)     
 Pergamasus tibiaspinalis Schmolzer, 1995     
 Pergamasus tortulatus (Athias-Henriot, 1979)     
 Pergamasus varpulus (Athias-Henriot, 1967)

References

Parasitidae